Just for Kicks may refer to:

 Just for Kicks (2003 film), a comedy
 Just for Kicks (2005 film), a documentary about sneakers
 Just for Kicks (TV series), a 2006 American comedy-drama